R. baileyi

Rhododendron baileyi, a species of Rhododendron
Ruspolia baileyi, the Nsenene, a species of grasshopper
Rotalina baileyi, a species of algae in the chromista